The Schulich School of Music (also known as Schulich) is one of the constituent faculties of McGill University in Montreal, Quebec, Canada. It is located at 555, rue Sherbrooke Ouest (555, Sherbrooke Street West). The faculty was named after benefactor Seymour Schulich.

McGill University's Schulich School of Music runs 50 different programs in research and performance and holds 700 concerts annually. Over 35% of the student body is international. At least 13 Grammy Award winners have been affiliated with the Schulich School of Music, including George Massenburg, Estelí Gomez, Serban Ghenea, Steven Epstein, Jennifer Gasoi, Brian Losch, Chilly Gonzales, Win Butler, Nick Squire, Leonard Cohen, Richard King, Régine Chassagne, and Burt Bacharach.

History

Early history 

Music teaching at the institution began in 1884, with a program reserved for women. In 1889, a teaching specialist was engaged at the request of the students by a gift from the university's Chancellor, Donald A. Smith, Lord Strathcona. In 1896, the Royal Victoria College for girls by Lord Strathcona was founded. In September 1899, the Royal Victoria College was opened, and pianist Clara Lichtenstein (1860–1946) arrived on the invitation of Lord Strathcona. In 1902, examinations of the Associate Board of the Royal Schools of Music of London were introduced.

McGill Conservatorium of Music 

1904 Introduction of the Licentiate diploma (LMus), Bachelor in Music degree (BMus), and Doctor in Music degree (DMus).
September 21, classes began in the Workman House with 426 students and 23 instructors.
October 14, official inauguration in the presence of the Governor General, Lord Minot, with a recital by violinist Albert Chamberland and pianist Ellen Ballon.
1908 Appointment of Harry Crane Perrin, organist of Canterbury Cathedral, as professor and director.
1908 McGill's first university symphonic ensemble is created.
1911 Charles Henry Mills receives the first DMus degree, for composition.
1917 Endowment through a generous gift from Sir William Macdonald permitting the establishment of a faculty of music.

Faculty of Music and Conservatorium of Music (1957–1989) 

1964 Helmut Blume named dean of the Faculty of Music.  He served until 1979 and oversaw the school's early development into one of Canada's major music schools.
1966 The McGill Conservatorium of Music becomes the McGill Preparatory School of Music.
1970 The two institutions were separated, but remained under the same direction until 1978.
1971 Both institutions moved to the Royal Victoria College, which was renovated and renamed the Strathcona Music Building.
1978 The Preparatory School becomes the McGill Conservatory of Music.
1981 McGill becomes the first university in Canada to offer a BMus degree in jazz performance.
1989 The McGill Opera Studio is renamed Opera McGill, with Bernard Turgeon as director and Timothy Vernon as conductor.

School renamed – new building 

2005 The New Music Building is opened and the Faculty of Music changes its name to the Schulich School of Music of McGill University.
2010 Inaugural season of the McGill International String Quartet Academy.

Degrees and programs

Performance

Undergraduate Programs in Performance 

Bachelor of Music (BMus) in Early Music (Instruments and Voice), Faculty Program (Jazz or Classical), Guitar, Jazz (Instruments and Voice), Orchestral Instruments (Brass, Percussion, Strings, Woodwinds), Organ, Piano, Voice
Licentiate in Music (LMus) in Early Music (Instruments and Voice), Guitar, Jazz (Instruments and Voice), Orchestral Instruments (Brass, Percussion, Strings, Woodwinds), Organ, Piano, Voice

Double Majors and Double Degree

Bachelor of Music students can add a second major or degree to their program, either within the School of Music or at other faculties at McGill University

Music Performance Minors

 Early Music
Conducting
Jazz Arranging and Composition
Jazz Performance
In addition to Music minors, B.Mus. students can add minors offered by other faculties at McGill University

Graduate Programs in Performance

Master of Music (MMus) in Conducting, Early Music (Instruments and Voice), Guitar, Jazz (instruments and Voice), Orchestral Instruments (Brass, Percussion, Strings, Woodwinds), Organ, Piano, Collaborative Piano, Voice and Opera
 Graduate Diploma in Performance and Artist Diploma in Early Music (Instruments and Voice), Guitar, Jazz (Instruments and Voice), Orchestral Instruments (Brass, Percussion, Strings, Woodwinds), Organ, Piano, Voice and Opera
Graduate Certificate in Choral Conducting
Doctor of Music (DMus) in Performance Studies (Brass, Conducting, Early Music, Guitar, Jazz, Organ, Percussion, Piano, Strings, Voice and Opera, Woodwinds)

Music research

Undergraduate Programs in Music Research

 Bachelor of Music (BMus) in Composition, Faculty Program (Classical or Jazz), Music Education, Music History/Musicology, Music Theory

Double Majors and Double Degree

Bachelor of Music students can add a second major or degree to their program, either within the School of Music or at other faculties at McGill University

Music Research Minors

Composition
Music Education
Music Entrepreneurship
Music History / Musicology
 Musical Applications of Technology
 Music Science and Technology
 Music Theory
In addition to Music minors, B.Mus. students can add minors offered by other faculties at McGill University

Graduate Programs in Music Research 
 Master of Music (MMus) in Composition, Sound Recording
 Master of Arts (MA) in Music Education, Music History/Musicology, Music Technology, Music Theory
 Doctor of Music (DMus) in Composition
Doctor of Philosophy (PhD) in Composition, Music Education, Musicology, Music Technology, Music Theory, Sound Recording

Performing ensembles

Orchestras 
McGill Symphony Orchestra (MGSO)
Contemporary Music Ensemble (CME)
McGill Wind Orchestra
Baroque Orchestra
Beethoven Orchestra

Jazz 
McGill Jazz Orchestra I
McGill Jazz Orchestra II
McGill Chamber Jazz Ensemble
Jazz Rhythm Section Ensembles
McGill Jazz Choir
Jazz Combos

Choral 
McGill University Chorus
Schulich Singers
McGill Concert Choir
Cappella Antica

Opera McGill
Opera McGill was described by Opera Canada magazine as "the premiere program in Canada." Every year, Opera McGill produces at least three operas on the Pollack Hall stage. It collaborates with the Early Music Program at Schulich to produce a baroque opera (accompanied by period instruments and in period tunings). In 2016, the program celebrated its 60th anniversary.

Other 
Chamber Music
Early Music Ensembles
Song Interpretation
Guitar Ensemble
Piano Ensembles
Percussion Ensemble
Tabla Ensemble

Facilities

The Schulich School of Music has two main buildings on campus – the Strathcona Music Building and the Elizabeth Wirth Music Building.

The Strathcona Music Building was originally home to Royal Victoria College, the women's college of McGill University. Presently, the building has two wings – referred to as the Center Wing and the East Wing. The Center Wing is home to a concert hall (Pollack Hall), a small recital hall (Clara Lichenstein Recital Hall), a large lecture room, teaching studios, class rooms and ensemble rehearsal spaces. Pollack Hall is the largest performance venue at the Schulich School of Music with over 600 seats. The East Wing is situated in the middle of the Center Wing of the Stracona Music Building and the New Music Building. The basement of the East Wing is home to the Music Undergraduate Students' Association office, the students' newspaper office (The Phonograph) and a student cafeteria. The second, third, four and fifth floors house the teaching assistants' offices and the practice rooms for instrumentalists, pianists and vocalists.

The Elizabeth Wirth Music Building (EWMB; previously the New Music Building) was built in 2005 thanks to a $20 million gift from McGill grad Seymour Schulich. The building has 8 floors above ground and two below ground. The bottom floor is known as -2 (minus 2) and is home to the Wirth Opera Studio (named after Manfred and Eliza Wirth), the Music Multimedia Room (MMR) as well as smaller recording studios. The first floor is home to a spacious lobby. On the first and the second floor are entrances to Tanna Schulich Hall, an intimate performance venue which seats 187 people. The third, fourth and fifth floor of the EWMB are home to the Marvin Duchow Music Library. The Gertrude Whitley Performance Library and the Music Student Computer Room, which was updated during the fall of 2008, can also be found on the fifth floor. The sixth floor is reserved for faculty office spaces. The seventh floor is the home of the Schulich School of Music administration and the 8th floor is home to CIRMMT. On April 30, 2015, the building was officially inaugurated as the Elizabeth Wirth Music Building, thanks to a donation of $7.5 million from McGill alumna Elizabeth Wirth.

Recitals and concerts are also frequently held at Redpath Hall on McGill University's main campus.

The Schulich School of Music occupies 148,650 sq. ft. of space. This includes:
 113 practice rooms
 13 classrooms
 10 ensemble rooms
 Four performing halls: Pollack Hall, Redpath Hall, Tanna Schulich Hall, Clara Lichtenstein Hall
 A state-of-the-art Music Multimedia Room
 Wirth Opera Studio
 The Marvin Duchow Music Library
 The Centre for Interdisciplinary Research in Music Media and Technology (CIRMMT)

817 instruments are available for student use at the Schulich School of Music. This includes:
 117 pianos
 55 electric pianos
 160 percussion
 485 woodwind, brass and string instruments

Centre for Interdisciplinary Research in Music Media and Technology
The Centre for Interdisciplinary Research in Music Media and Technology is known as CIRMMT. CIRMMT is a multi-disciplinary research centre involving researchers at McGill University and other institutions. The centre has research labs in New Music Building. The Centre's research axes are:

 Instruments, devices and systems
 Music information research
 Cognition, perception and movement
 Expanded musical practice

Reputation
It was ranked as the top ranked music school in Canada and was ranked 31st globally according to the 2022 QS World University Rankings.

Notable people

Alumni 
Ayal Adler, Israeli composer
Peter Allen, Canadian composer, organist, and keyboard player
Tom Allen, broadcaster, concert host, trombonist
Lydia Ainsworth, composer, producer and singer
István Anhalt, Hungarian-Canadian composer
Darcy James Argue, jazz composer and bandleader
Julian Armour, cellist and artistic director
Jeannette Aster, Austrian opera director
David Atkinson, Canadian baritone and New York Broadway actor/singer
Serban Ghenea, 19 Grammy Awards and three Latin Grammy Awards winning audio engineer and mixer
Burt Bacharach, Grammy and Academy award-winning composer, songwriter, record producer, and pianist
Ellen Ballon, classical pianist
Jill Beck, American dancer, scholar, administrator and educator, former president of Lawrence University
Annesley Black, composer
Paul Bley, jazz pianist
Joyce Borenstein, director and animator
Alexander Brott,  Canadian conductor, composer, violinist and music teacher, founded and directed the McGill Chamber Orchestra
Donna Brown, Canadian soprano opera singer
Busty and the Bass, Canadian electro-soul and hip hop band wherein the members met while in school
Rufus Cappadocia, Canadian-American cellist 
Albert Chamberland, Canadian violinist, composer, conductor, music producer, and music educator
Régine Chassagne, singer, songwriter, musician, multi-instrumentalist, and member of Arcade Fire
Taylor Brook, composer and musician
Peter Butterfield, Canadian conductor and classical tenor, director of the Victoria Philharmonic Choir
Suad Bushnaq, Jordanian-Canadian film and concert composer
John Austin Clark, American music director and keyboardist, founder and current director of Bourbon Baroque
Francis Coleman, conductor and television producer and director
Alcée Chriss III, American organist, composer and conductor
Jonathan Crow, Toronto Symphony Orchestra concertmaster
Marvin Duchow, composer, teacher and musicologist, expert on Renaissance music and the music of eighteenth century France
José Evangelista, Spanish composer and music educator
Clifford Ford, composer, editor, music educator, and author
Estelí Gomez, multiple Grammy award-winning American musician
Chilly Gonzales, Grammy award-winning pianist and singer
Donna Grantis,  Canadian guitarist, known for work with Prince & 3rdeyegirl
Jennifer Grout,  American singer of Arabic and Amazigh (Tashelhit) music
Aaron Harris,  American  drummer and percussionist for the band Islands
Sinjin Hawke,  Canadian-American electronic music producer and DJ
Larry Henderson, broadcaster, actor, news anchor, writer
Timothy L. Jackson, American professor of music theory at University of North Texas
Kelly Jefferson, jazz saxophonist
Christine Jensen, Juno Award-winning composer, conductor, and saxophonist
Alessandro Juliani, Canadian actor and singer
Gillian Keith, soprano
Richard King, multi Grammy award-winning recording engineer
Veronika Krausas, composer
Robert Silverman, Canadian pianist and piano pedagogue
Caroline Leonardelli, French concert harpist
Jens Lindemann, trumpet soloist
Michel Perrault, composer, conductor, music educator, and percussionist
Earl MacDonald, director of Jazz Studies at the University of Connecticut, former musical director and pianist with Maynard Ferguson
Martin MacDonald, resident conductor with Symphony Nova Scotia
Charles Henry Mills, English-American composer and director of the University of Wisconsin–Madison School of Music
Robin Minard,  composer and installation artist
Simon Morrison, scholar and writer specializing in 20th-century music
Karina Gauvin, Canadian soprano 
Helga Rut Guðmundsdóttir, professor of music education at the University of Iceland 
Dorothy Morton, pianist and instructor
Geoffrey Moull, music director of the Thunder Bay Symphony Orchestra, mentor of the Opera Program at Wilfrid Laurier University
Natasha Negovanlis, actress, writer, producer, and singer
Charles O'Neill, Canadian bandmaster, composer, organist, cornetist, and music educator
Donald Patriquin, Canadian composer, organist, and choral conductor
Mauro Pezzente, co-founder of Godspeed You! Black Emperor
Jimmie LeBlanc, Canadian composer and guitarist
Boris Brott, Canadian conductor and composer
Eldon Rathburn, Canadian film composer who scored over 250 films
Jay Reise, American composer
Matthew Ricketts, classical composer
Richard Roberts, Montreal Symphony Orchestra concertmaster, professor of violin
Susan Rogers, American professor, sound engineer and record producer, professor of music at Berklee College of Music
Elizabeth Shepherd, singer, songwriter, pianist and producer
Philippe Sly, bass-baritone and opera, oratorio and recital singer
Grant Stewart, Canadian jazz saxophonist
Donald Steven, composer, Juno Award for Classical Composition of the Year, Jules Léger Prize for New Chamber Music
Nora Sourouzian, Armenian-Canadian mezzo-soprano 
Sylvia Sweeney, Canadian executive television producer and Olympian
Daniel Taylor, countertenor, director of the Theatre of Early Music, adjunct professor at the Schulich School of Music
Maja Trochimczyk, American music historian, writer and poet
Robert Turner,  Canadian composer, radio producer, and music educator
Alexandra Stréliski, neo-classical composer and pianist 
Rufus Wainwright, singer, songwriter, pianist, and composer
Ella May Walker, composer and organist
Marguerita Spencer, Canadian pianist, organist, composer and educator
Charles Richard-Hamelin, concert pianist
Pauline Donalda, Canadian operatic soprano
Alfred Whitehead, English-born Canadian composer, organist, choirmaster, music educator, painter
Gino Vannelli, rock singer and songwriter
Frédérique Vézina, soprano
John Oliver, composer and organist
Nina C. Young, American electro-acoustic composer of contemporary classical music

Current and past faculty members 
István Anhalt, Hungarian-Canadian composer
Andrew Dawes, Canadian violinist
Alfred De Sève, Canadian violinist, composer, and music educator
Claude Champagne, French Canadian composer, teacher, pianist, and violinist
Douglas Clarke, English organist, conductor, composer and academic, conductor of the Montreal Orchestra
Ira Coleman, French-American jazz bassist
Steven Epstein, 16 Grammy Award-winning American record producer
Marina Goglidze-Mdivani, professor of piano
Matt Haimovitz, professor of strings and cello
Melissa Hui, Chinese-Canadian composer and pianist
Oliver Jones, jazz pianist, organist, composer and arranger
Michael Laucke, classical, new flamenco and flamenco guitarist and composer
Suzie LeBlanc, soprano and professor of voice
Daniel Levitin, American-Canadian cognitive psychologist, neuroscientist, writer, musician, and record producer
Matt Haimovitz, professor of strings and cello
Bengt Hambraeus, Swedish organist, composer and musicologist
William Caplin, American music theorist, former president of the Society for Music Theory
Theodore Baskin, Principal Oboe of the Montreal Symphony Orchestra
Charles A. E. Harriss, English impresario, educator, organist-choirmaster and conductor, founding director of the McGill Conservatorium of Music (today the Schulich School of Music)
Brian Jackson, British-Canadian conductor, organist and pianist
Kelsey Jones,  Canadian composer, pianist, harpsichordist, and music teacher
Alcides Lanza,  Argentinian composer, conductor, pianist, and music educator 
Hugh Le Caine, Canadian physicist, composer, and instrument builder
Philippe Leroux, French composer
Clara Lichtenstein,  Hungarian pianist
Camille Thurman, American jazz musician, composer, and member of the Jazz at Lincoln Center Orchestra
Rémi Bolduc, Canadian jazz saxophonist, bandleader and composer
John Rea, composer, former dean of the Schulich School of Music of McGill University
Kent Nagano,  American conductor, opera administrator, and ex-conductor of the Montreal Symphony Orchestra
Kenneth Gilbert, Canadian harpsichordist, organist, musicologist, and music educator
Ellen Ballon, classical pianist
George Massenburg, multiple Grammy Award-winning recording engineer and inventor
Bruce Mather, Canadian composer, pianist, and writer
Paul Pedersen,  composer, arts administrator, and music educator
Harry Crane Perrin, British cathedral organist and academic, served as the first dean of music at McGill University
Alexis Hauser, Austrian conductor
Jan Simons, Canadian baritone, music teacher and administrator
Axel Strauss, German violinist
Sanford Sylvan, American Baritone
Joel Quarrington, Canadian double bass player, soloist, teacher, and the former Principal Double Bass of the London Symphony Orchestra
Richard King, multi Grammy award-winning recording engineer
John Hollenbeck, American jazz drummer and composer known for his work with The Claudia Quintet and Bob Brookmeyer
Geoffrey Moull, music director of the Thunder Bay Symphony Orchestra, mentor of the Opera Program at Wilfrid Laurier University
Christopher Jackson, Canadian organist, harpsichordist and choral conductor
Denys Bouliane, Canadian composer and conductor
Boris Brott, Canadian conductor and composer
Brian Cherney, Canadian composer
Lina Pizzolongo, vocal coach and concert pianist
Raymond Daveluy, composer, organist, music educator, and arts administrator

History of Deans 
Clara Lichtenstein 1886 - 1904  
Charles A. E. Harriss 1904 - 1920 
Harry Crane Perrin 1920 - 1930 
Douglas Clarke 1930 - 1955
Marvin Duchow 1955 - 1963
Helmuth Blume 1963 - 1976
Paul Pedersen 1976 - 1986
John Rea 1986 - 1991
John Grew 1991 - 1996
Richard Lawton 1996 - 2001
Don McLean 2001 - 2010
Gordon Foote 2010 - 2011  
Sean Ferguson 2011 - 2016 
Brenda Ravenscroft 2016 - 2022 
Sean Ferguson 2022 - Present

Special events and conferences
During the 2015-2016 concert season, the Schulich School of Music put on over 700 performances.
For 30 years, the McGill/CBC concert series has delivered music to audiences across Canada. It is reported to be the longest university/radio concert series in Canadian history.
From 2004-2010, the school hosted a contemporary music festival called the MusiMarch Festival.

Photo gallery

See also 
 McGill University
 Seymour Schulich

References

External links
Schulich School of Music

Music schools in Canada
McGill University
Educational institutions established in 1904
1904 establishments in Quebec